Hassan Ali Hammoud (born 26 September 1986) is a Lebanese footballer who plays as a midfielder for  club Sagesse.

Club career 
Hammoud moved to Nabi Chit from Ahed on 21 August 2014.

Honours
Mabarra
 Lebanese FA Cup: 2007–08; runner-up: 2009–10

Ahed
 Lebanese Elite Cup: 2013; runner-up: 2012

Individual
 Lebanese Premier League Best Goal: 2009–10

References

External links
 
 
 
  (2011–2014)
  (2014–present)
 

1986 births
Living people
People from Baabda District
Lebanese footballers
Association football midfielders
Al Mabarra Club players
Al Ahed FC players
Al Nabi Chit SC players
Shabab El Bourj SC players
Sagesse SC footballers
Lebanese Premier League players
Lebanese Second Division players
Lebanon international footballers